The term Western Palearctic black-and-white flycatchers is used to refer to a group of similar-looking birds in the genus Ficedula:

 Atlas pied flycatcher F. speculigera which breeds in Northwest Africa
 Collared flycatcher F. albicollis which breeds in Eastern Europe
 European pied flycatcher F. hypoleuca which breeds in Western Europe
 Semi-collared flycatcher F. semitorquata of Southeast Europe and Southwest Asia

European pied and collared flycatchers hybridise to a limited extent where their ranges meet; the hybrids have reduced fitness and usually do not survive their first winter (Parkin 2003). Female hybrids are usually sterile (Gelter et al. 1992; see also Haldane's Rule).

All species leave their breeding grounds to winter in Sub-Saharan Africa.

References
 Gelter, H. P.; Tegelström, H. & Gustafsson, L. (1992): Evidence from hatching success and DNA fingerprinting for the fertility of hybrid Pied × Collared Flycatchers Ficedula hypoleuca – albicollis. Ibis 134(1): 62–68.
 Parkin, David T. (2003): Birding and DNA: species for the new millennium. Bird Study 50(3): 223–242. HTML abstract

Ficedula